The Connecticut Liquor Division is a Connecticut state government agency responsible for enforcing Title 30 (The Connecticut Liquor Control Act) and its corresponding regulations. It serves as the primary investigative arm of the Connecticut Liquor Control Commission.

State alcohol agencies of the United States
State agencies of Connecticut